Sergey Kopenkin (born 26 November 1971) is a Kyrgyzstani former boxer. He competed in the men's lightweight event at the 1996 Summer Olympics.

References

External links
 

1971 births
Living people
Kyrgyzstani male boxers
Olympic boxers of Kyrgyzstan
Boxers at the 1996 Summer Olympics
Place of birth missing (living people)
Lightweight boxers